FC Electrosila Leningrad or Krasnaya Zorya was a Soviet association football club from Leningrad, Soviet Union. The club played in the Soviet Top League from its inception to World War II. Until 1930 Krasnaya Zorya played in local competitions of Leningrad city and later in the city championship. In 1940 it lost most of its players when massive changes took place in the Soviet competitions before the 1941 season.

Team name history
Krasnaya Zaria Leningrad (1922-37)
Elektrik Leningrad (1938-39)
Krasnaya Zaria Leningrad (1940-45)
Elektrosila Leningrad (1946)

Stadium
During its time in the Soviet Top League Elektrosila played its games at the central stadium of the city, the Lenin Stadium. Other times the club played its games at the Red Triangle Stadium.

League and Cup history
{|class="wikitable"
|-bgcolor="#efefef"
! Season
! Division
! Position
! Pl.
! W
! D
! L
! GS
! GA
! P
!Domestic Cup
!colspan=2|Europe
!Notes
|-
|colspan=14 align=center|Krasnaya Zaria Leningrad
|-
|align=center|1936 (Spring)
|align=center rowspan="3"|1st
|align=center|7
|align=center|6
|align=center|1
|align=center|1
|align=center|4
|align=center|8
|align=center|21
|align=center|9
|align=center|
|align=center|
|align=center|
|align=center|
|-
|align=center|1936 (Autumn)
|align=center|5
|align=center|7
|align=center|3
|align=center|0
|align=center|4
|align=center|13
|align=center|18
|align=center|13
|align=center|
|align=center|
|align=center|
|align=center|
|-
|align=center|1937
|align=center|8
|align=center|16
|align=center|4
|align=center|4
|align=center|8
|align=center|17
|align=center|31
|align=center|28
|align=center|
|align=center|
|align=center|
|align=center|
|-
|colspan=14 align=center|Elektrik Leningrad
|-
|align=center|1938
|align=center rowspan="2"|1st
|align=center|13
|align=center|25
|align=center|8
|align=center|8
|align=center|9
|align=center|42
|align=center|44
|align=center|24
|align=center|
|align=center|
|align=center|
|align=center|
|-
|align=center|1939
|align=center|13
|align=center|26
|align=center|6
|align=center|5
|align=center|15
|align=center|32
|align=center|49
|align=center|17
|align=center|
|align=center|
|align=center|
|align=center bgcolor=red|Relegated
|-
|colspan=14 align=center|Krasnaya Zaria Leningrad
|-
|align=center|1940
|align=center|2nd
|align=center bgcolor=gold|1
|align=center|26
|align=center|15
|align=center|5
|align=center|6
|align=center|54
|align=center|36
|align=center|35
|align=center|No competition
|align=center|
|align=center|
|align=center bgcolor=grey|merged with Zenit
|-
|colspan=14 align=center|World War II
|-
|colspan=14 align=center|Elektrosila Leningrad
|-
|align=center|1946
|align=center|2nd
|align=center|11
|align=center|24
|align=center|5
|align=center|6
|align=center|13
|align=center|23
|align=center|50
|align=center|16
|align=center|
|align=center|
|align=center|
|align=center|East subgroup
|-
|}

Honours
 Soviet First League
 Winners (1): 1940
 Soviet Cup
 Runners-up (1): 1938

References

External links
 Stats at www.klisf.info
 Leningrad clubs in the top league

Association football clubs established in 1922
Defunct football clubs in Saint Petersburg
1922 establishments in Russia
Soviet Top League clubs